The 2010 Louisiana–Lafayette Ragin' Cajuns softball team represented the University of Louisiana at Lafayette in the 2010 NCAA Division I softball season. The Ragin' Cajuns played their home games at Lamson Park and were led by tenth and eleventh year husband and wife head coaching duo Michael and Stefni Lotief, respectively.

Roster

Coaching staff

Schedule and results

Baton Rouge Regional

Los Angeles Super Regional

References

Louisiana
Louisiana Ragin' Cajuns softball seasons
Louisiana softball